Sisurcana rhora is a species of moth of the family Tortricidae. It is found in Ecuador in the provinces of Loja and Morona-Santiago.

References

Moths described in 2004
Sisurcana
Moths of South America
Taxa named by Józef Razowski